Thomas Somerville may refer to:
 Thomas Somerville, 1st Lord Somerville (died 1434), Lord of the Parliament of Scotland
 Thomas Somerville (minister) (1740–1830), Scottish minister, antiquarian and amateur scientist
 Sir Thomas de Somerville (c. 1245–1300), Scottish noble

See also
 Thomas Somerville Stewart (1806–1889) was a Philadelphia architect, engineer, and real estate developer